Isabela Ramona Lyra Macedo (born January 23, 1994) is a Brazilian basketball player for Valencia Basket and the Brazilian national team, where she participated at the 2014 FIBA World Championship.

She was also a member of the Brazil women's national basketball team which competed at the 2015 Pan American Games.

References

1994 births
Living people
Brazilian women's basketball players
Basketball players at the 2015 Pan American Games
Basketball players at the 2016 Summer Olympics
Basketball players at the 2019 Pan American Games
Olympic basketball players of Brazil
Pan American Games medalists in basketball
Shooting guards
Sportspeople from Salvador, Bahia
Pan American Games gold medalists for Brazil
Medalists at the 2019 Pan American Games